Kirill Vladimirovich Abrosimov (born 22 November 1991) is a Russian swimmer. He won the men's 5 km event at the European Open Water Championships in 2012 and in 2016. He also won the men's 10 km event in 2012.

In 2011, he won the silver medal in the men's 10 km event at the 2011 Summer Universiade held in Shenzhen, China.

In 2016, he won the men's 5 km event at the 2016 European Open Water Championships held in Hoorn, Netherlands.

In 2021, he won the bronze medal in the men's 25 km event at the 2020 European Aquatics Championships held in Budapest, Hungary. He also competed in the men's 5 km, men's 10 km and team events. Subsequently, he competed in the men's 10 km event at the 2020 Summer Olympics.

References

Living people
1991 births
Place of birth missing (living people)
Russian male swimmers
Male long-distance swimmers
Medalists at the 2011 Summer Universiade
Universiade silver medalists for Russia
Universiade medalists in swimming
European Aquatics Championships medalists in swimming
20th-century Russian people
21st-century Russian people